Ron "Toppy" Vann (born c. 1936) is a former American football quarterback who played one season with the BC Lions of the Canadian Football League. He played college football at Georgia Tech.

See also 

 List of Georgia Tech Yellow Jackets starting quarterbacks

External links
Just Sports Stats
College stats
Fanbase profile

Living people
Year of birth missing (living people)
Players of American football from Georgia (U.S. state)
American football quarterbacks
Canadian football quarterbacks
American players of Canadian football
Georgia Tech Yellow Jackets football players
BC Lions players
People from Rossville, Georgia